The 1951 Colorado A&M Aggies football team represented Colorado State College of Agriculture and Mechanic Arts in the Skyline Conference during the 1951 college football season.  In their fifth season under head coach Bob Davis, the Aggies compiled a 5–4–1 record (3–3–1 against Skyline opponents), finished fourth in the Skyline Conference, and outscored all opponents by a total of 242 to 158.

Schedule

References

Colorado AandM
Colorado State Rams football seasons
Colorado AandM Aggies football